Gary Burger (June 7, 1942 – March 14, 2014) was an American musician, best known as the guitarist and vocalist for the rock band the Monks.

Biography
Burger joined the U.S. Army immediately after graduating from Bemidji High School and was stationed in Germany. Burger formed the Five Torquays in 1964 with four other American soldiers he met in Germany. According to him, he joined the band partially because it got him out of his regular job as a fuel truck driver. The Torquays mainly played in hospitals and nursing homes in the beginning and produced a single in a small studio in Heidelberg. Their repertoire consisted mainly of Chuck Berry covers before moving on to more avant-garde original material.

A group of German students noticed the band and agreed to manage them if they changed their outfits. The band all wore black cassocks, nooses around their necks, and shaved the top of their heads. By 1965 the Five Torquays had become the Monks. They recorded one album, 1966's Black Monk Time. Although the Monks met with little success during their tenure, they were later cited as an influence on various artists, ranging from Jack White to The Fall. Burger's voice was described by Sean O'Neal as "a yowl that was soulful in its own strangled-cat sort of way." After touring Europe for three years, the Monks broke up in 1967.

After the breakup, Burger moved back to the United States and enrolled at Bemidji State University on a GI Bill scholarship. He found work digging septic systems by hand. "I loved that job, down in a hole with a shovel," he said. The Minnesota Department of Natural Resources later hired Burger to create films and advertisements. He opened a small recording studio that serviced the northern Minnesota music scene. In November 1999, Burger reunited with his former Monks bandmates to play a reunion show in New York City after learning copies of Black Monk Time had become collectors items.

Burger was elected mayor of Turtle River, Minnesota in 2006. In 2009, he reflected on his time in the Monks: "We all knew that we were doing a different sort of music, but as far as being a forerunner band—that was the furthest from our minds. We really weren’t thinking that. We had no idea that we were creating a new movement. And I’m still thinking, hey, we were just a rock and roll band that really had a lot of fun, and was able to be lucky enough—or unlucky enough, depending on your point of view—to work on the album." He died of pancreatic cancer on March 14, 2014, at the age of 71.

References

1942 births
2014 deaths
American rock singers
Deaths from pancreatic cancer
Mayors of places in Minnesota
Protopunk musicians
Singers from Minnesota
The Monks members
Polydor Records artists
People from Beltrami County, Minnesota
United States Army soldiers